Quinaceo Tyce Evan Hunt (born 21 January 2000) is a Bermudan footballer who currently plays as a goalkeeper for Pickering Town.

Club career
Hunt started his career in Bermuda with the PHC Zebras. In 2019 he moved to England to sign for newly created club Wakefield.

Following his departure from Wakefield, Hunt joined Durham City, where he went on to make three appearances in the Northern Football League. However, in December 2020, it was announced that Hunt would join Billingham Synthonia for 2021.

His spell with Billingham Synthonia did not last long, and in August 2021, he signed for Tow Law Town. However, this spell was even shorter, and in September of the same year, he moved to Thornaby.

Career statistics

Club

Notes

International

References

2000 births
Living people
Bermudian footballers
Bermuda youth international footballers
Bermuda under-20 international footballers
Bermuda international footballers
Association football goalkeepers
Northern Football League players
PHC Zebras players
Durham City A.F.C. players
Billingham Synthonia F.C. players
Tow Law Town F.C. players
Thornaby F.C. players
Bermudian expatriate footballers
Bermudian expatriate sportspeople in England
Expatriate footballers in England